Livade is a village located near Oprtalj and Motovun, in Istria, Croatia.

The spa Istarske Toplice is located in Livade.

References

Populated places in Istria County